Genghis Khan is a Chinese television series based on the life of Genghis Khan, the founder of the Mongol Empire in the 13th century. Ba Sen, who portrayed the eponymous character in the series, is a descendant of Genghis Khan's second son, Chagatai. The series was first broadcast on CCTV in China in 2004, on KBS in South Korea in 2005, and the Turkish state channel TRT 1.

Plot
The 30 episodes long television series depicts the major events in the life of Temüjin, the founder of the Mongol Empire in the 13th century. It begins with his birth and his struggle for survival in his childhood and adolescent years after the death of his father, Yesugei. With support from his allies and his father's former followers, Temüjin becomes the leader of the Borjigin tribe and emerges as one of the most powerful warlords in Mongolia. After spending decades on the battlefield, Temüjin eventually succeeds in uniting all the Mongol tribes under his rule and adopts the honorific title "Genghis Khan" ("supreme ruler" in the Mongol language). Genghis Khan continues to lead his armies to attack the Khwarezmid Empire in the west and the Jurchen-led Jin Empire in the south before dying from illness during a campaign against the Western Xia kingdom.

Cast

Genghis Khan and his family
 Ba Sen as Temüjin (Genghis Khan), the founder of the Mongol Empire.
 Ba Sen also portrayed Yesugei, Temüjin's father and the chief of the Borjigin tribe.
 Ke'er Qinbi Shaoge as Temüjin (9 years old)
 Xilin Manda as Temüjin (12 years old)
 Daleng Zhaorige as Temüjin (16 years old)
 Saren Gaowa as Hoelun, Temüjin's mother.
 Hasi Qiqige as Yesügei's concubine.
 Suo Lizhong as Börte, Temüjin's first wife.
 Aruna as Börte (young)
 Siqin Bilige as Hasar, Temüjin's second brother.
 Guo Jianhua as Hasar (young)
 Wuri Jitu as Belgutei, Temüjin's third brother.
 Tumen Gerile as Belgutei (young)
 Saixingga as Hachiun, Temüjin's fourth brother.
 Sang Bao as Temüge, Temüjin's fifth brother.
 Dai Qin as Temüge (young)
 Wulan Qiqige as Temülen, Temüjin's sister.
 Liu Min as Jochi, Temüjin's eldest son.
 Jiang Tao as Chagatai, Temüjin's second son.
 Wang Dong as Mutukan, Chagatai's son.
 Huhe as Ögedei, Temüjin's third son and successor.
 Yang Jun as Tolui, Temüjin's fourth son.
 Qin Yongxiao as Alakhai Bekhi, Temüjin's daughter.
 Zheng Shuang as Yesui, Temüjin's concubine and Yeke-cheren's daughter.
 Nuoming Yeri as Yesugen, Yesui's sister and Temüjin's concubine.
 Chen Sicheng as Khulan, Temüjin's concubine and Dayir-Usun's daughter.
 Nala as Qoaqchin, a female slave who served Temüjin's family.

Genghis Khan's relatives
Borjigin tribe
 Suya Ladalai as Daridai, Temüjin's fourth uncle.
 Hasi Bate as Negun Taiji, Temüjin's second uncle.
 Wurigen as Khuchar, Temüjin's cousin.
 Nuoribu as Altan, Temüjin's distant uncle.
 Dalie Lihan as Mönglik, Temüjin's distant uncle.
 Guan Qige as Charaqa, Mönglik's father.
 Suhe as Kököchü, Mönglik's son and a shaman.
 He Qi as Jürchedei, Temüjin's distant cousin.

Khongirad tribe
 Bala Zhu'er as Dai Sechen, Börte's father and Genghis Khan's father-in-law.
 Tuhai as Dai Sechen's wife and Börte's mother

Genghis Khan's followers
 Liang Baoshan as Bo'orchu
 Jinge Naoribu as Bo'orchu (young)
 Wulan Baoyin as Chilaun, a former member of the Tayichiud tribe.
 Gala as Chilaun (young)
 Liu Yuhua as Muqali, a former slave of Sacha Beki.
 Menghe as Borokhula, a Taichiud adopted by Hoelun.
 Bao Hailong as Jelme
 Xiaoba Te'er as Subutai, Jelme's brother.
 Wu Chengsen as Qubilai
 Qina Ritu as Jebe (Jirqo'adai), a former follower of Targutai.
 Xiao Xiaohua as Shikhikhutag, a Tatar adopted by Hoelun. He becomes the Premier of the Mongol Empire later.
 Liu Baocheng as Quchu, one of Hoelun's adopted sons.
 Qin Chuan as Qorchi, a former follower of Jamukha who becomes an adviser to Genghis Khan.
 Ye Erjiang as Naya'a, a former follower of Targutai who becomes a Kheshig commander.
 Dao'er Qirenqin as Jarchiudai, Jelme and Subutai's father.
 Daniya as Zhenhai, a Uyghur merchant who becomes an advisor to Genghis Khan.
 Bilige as Quduqa, a chief of the Oirats who submits to Genghis Khan.
 Liu Lina as Lady Tarqun, a female chief of the Tümeds who submits to Genghis Khan.
 Alada'ertu as Dodai, a former slave who becomes a Mingghan commander.

Rival tribes
Jadaran tribe
 Zhao Hengxuan as Jamukha, the chief of the Jadaran tribe. He was initially Temüjin's sworn brother, but becomes his arch-rival later.
 Wulinhan as Taichar, Jamukha's younger brother.

Taichiud tribe
 Wuri Jitu as Ambaghai Khan, a Mongol chieftain who was executed by the Jurchens in the prologue.
 Huocha'er as Targutai, a grandson of Ambaghai Khan and distant uncle of Temüjin. He is one of Temüjin's rivals.
 Yiruohu as Örbei Khatun, Ambaghai Khan's wife.
 Yang Guanghua as Tödö'en-girte, a former aide to Yesügei. He defected to Targutai after Yesügei's death.
 Jiang Bula as Sorqan Shira, a slave of Targutai. He is Chilaun and Qa'daan's father.
 Dawa Zhuoma as Qa'daan, Chilaun's sister and Temüjin's romantic interest.
 Muqi'er as Qa'daan (young)
 Zengge as Qa'daan's husband

Yürki tribe
 Wuri Xilatu as Sacha Beki, a descendant of Khabul Khan and distant cousin of Temüjin. He becomes one of Temüjin's rivals.
 Yimin Tuoya as Khorichin Khatun, Sacha Beki's mother.
 Edeng Bate'er as Büri Bökö, a follower of Sacha Beki.

Merkit tribe
 Bate'er as Toqto'a, the chief of the Merkit tribe.
 Hou Tao as Qutu, Toqto'a's son.
 Yang Haiquan as Chilger, Toqto'a's brother.
 Danba as Dayir-Usun, a Merkit general whose daughter, Khulan, becomes Genghis Khan's concubine.
 Nashun as Qa'atai, a Merkit general.

Keraites
 Biligetu as Toghrul, the chief of the Keraites. He was initially Temüjin's ally but becomes his rival later.
 Qu Baogang as Jakha-Gambu, Toghrul Khan's brother.
 Ma Liping as Sengüm, Toghrul Khan's son.

Tatars
 Li Yihua as Temüjin Üge, the Tatar chief who was defeated and executed by Yesugei. Yesugei named his son Temüjin after Temüjin Üge.
 Li Yihua also portrayed Jalin Buqa, Temüjin Üge's son and successor. He poisoned Yesugei to death.
 Ala Tengwula as Megüjin-se'ültü, a Tatar chief.
 Wang Bin as Yeke-cheren, a Tatar general whose daughters, Yesui and Yesugen, become Genghis Khan's concubines.

Naimans
 Maimaiti Xielifu as Tayang Khan, the chief of the Naimans.
 Alafate as Kuchlug, Tayang Khan's son.
 Guzilinu'er Kutibile as Juerbiesu, Tayang Khan's concubine who becomes Genghis Khan's concubine after her husband's death.
 Daniya as Kökse'ü-sabraq, a Naiman general.
 Nijiati Aikebai'er as Tata-tonga, a Naiman scholar recruited by Genghis Khan to create a writing system for the Mongol language.

Jurchens, Khitans and Han Chinese
 Wang Wenjie as Emperor Xizong, an emperor of the Jurchen-led Jin Empire who executed Ambaghai Khan in the prologue.
 Li Kenai as Wanyan Yongji, an emperor of the Jin Empire. The Jin Empire came under attack by the Mongols during his reign.
 Wulinhan as Hushahu, a Jin general who betrayed Wanyan Yongji and killed him.
 Bate'er as Wanyan Jiujin, a Jin general.
 Liu Yimin as Wanyan Chenghui, the Jin prime minister.
 She Wang as Tushan Yi, Wanyan Chenghui's predecessor as the Jin prime minister.
 Wang Wensheng as Yelü Buhua, a Jin general of Khitan ethnicity who defects to the Mongols.
 Tao Jixin as Shimo Ming'an, a Jin general of Khitan ethnicity who defects to the Mongols.
 Liu Kui as Guo Baoyu, a Han Chinese scholar who becomes an important official of the Mongol Empire.
 Shen Guanchu as Yelü Chucai, a Khitan scholar who becomes an important official of the Mongol Empire.
 Song Guifu as Qiu Chuji, a reclusive Taoist rumoured to be an immortal.

Khwarezmid Empire
 Walisi as Muhammad II, the Shah of the Khwarezmid Empire.
 Abulimiti as Jalal ad-Din, Muhammad II's elder son.
 Patamureyiqin as Terken Khatun, Muhammad II's mother
 Aliyana as Uzlaq, Muhammad II's younger son.
 Mulading as Ghayir Khan, a Khwarezmid general and the governor of Otrar who triggered the war between the Mongols and the Khwarezmid Empire.
 Yasen as Keshili Khan, a Khwarezmid general and the governor of Bukhara.
 Daniya as Timur Malik, a Khwarezmid general and the governor of Khujand.

International broadcast

References

External links
  Genghis Khan on Sina.com
  Genghis Khan on Sohu

2004 Chinese television series debuts
2004 Chinese television series endings
Television series set in the Mongol Empire
Depictions of Genghis Khan on television
Chinese historical television series